Keti Chukhrov (Ketevan (Keti) Chukhrukidze (Chukhrov), ; born 26 July 1970 in Georgian Soviet Socialist Republic) is a Russian poet and academic, art theorist and philosopher. Doktor Nauk in Philosophical Sciences (2013), Candidate of philological sciences (1998), Docent at the National Research University Higher School of Economics (since 2016).

Career
She graduated from Philological Faculty of Lomonosov Moscow State University in 1994.

From 1998 to 2005, she works as an editor and translator for Logos-Altera Publishers.

In 2007, she lectured at Humboldt University in Berlin.

From 2010 to 2016, she works as a Docent at the Department of Art Theory and Cultural Studies at the Russian State University for the Humanities.

From 2012 to 2017, Chukhrov headed the department at National Center for Contemporary Art, Moscow.

She was a Marie S. Curie fellow (2017-2019) at the University of Wolverhampton.

She published in Voprosy Filosofii, Moscow Art Magazine, New Literary Review, Logos, and others.

She lives and works in Moscow.

She was longlisted for the 2017 Kandinsky Prize. She was shortlisted for the 2011 Andrei Bely Prize.

References

External links 
 Interview with Keti Chukhrov (Ketevan Chukhrukidze) on her research in the Russian Federation
 Interview with Dr. Keti Chukhrov, art theorist, philosopher, and poet
 Royal Institute of Philosophy public lecture: Dr Keti Chukhrov

Living people
1970 births
Russian women poets